Eyes Closed may refer to:
 "Eyes Closed" (song), a 2017 song by Halsey
 Eyes Closed EP, a 2003 EP by Alias, or the title song
 "Eyes Closed", a song by In Real Life
 "Eyes Closed", a song by Florida Georgia Line from Life Rolls On, 2021
 "Eyes Closed", an unreleased song by Kanye West